Aldobrandino III d'Este (14 September 1335 – 3 November 1361) was the Lord of Ferrara and Modena from 1352 until his death, in 1361.

He was the son of Obizzo III d'Este and Lippa Ariosti.

He was one of the first Italian lords to accompany Charles IV in his march to Rome to receive the imperial coronation, this deed gaining him numerous privileges.

1335 births
1361 deaths
Aldobrandino 3
Aldobrandino 3
14th-century Italian nobility